Tiago Nahuel Banega (born 1 July 1999) is an Argentine professional footballer who plays as a midfielder for Patronato, on loan from Racing Club.

Professional career
A youth product of Depro, Banega debuted with their senior team at the age of 15 before transferring to Racing Club in 2017. Banega made his professional debut with Racing Club in a 1-1 Argentine Primera División tie with Atlético Tucumán on 26 January 2020. On 5 February 2020, Banega signed his first professional contract with Racing Club. On 30 June 2021, Banega joined fellow league club Patronato on a loan deal until the end of 2022.

References

External links
 
 
 Racing Club Profile
 

1999 births
Living people
Sportspeople from Entre Ríos Province
Argentine footballers
Association football midfielders
Racing Club de Avellaneda footballers
Club Atlético Patronato footballers
Argentine Primera División players
Torneo Federal A players